Yang Wen-ke (born 22 March 1951) is a Taiwanese politician. He is the Magistrate of Hsinchu County since 25 December 2018 after winning the 2018 municipality election of the Republic of China on 24 November 2018.

Political career

Hsinchu County deputy magistrate
On 1 October 2016, Yang attended the North Taiwan Regional Development Committee's deputy leaders meeting held at Kinmen to discuss the expanded Taiwan Agricultural Product Joint Sales Exhibition. Yang participated by bringing high-quality agricultural produce from Hsinchu County to the exhibition to help promoting them.

2018 Hsinchu County magistrate election
On 13 June 2018, the Central Standing Committee of Kuomintang accepted the nomination of Yang as the party's candidate for the 2018 local election.

References

External links
 

1951 births
Living people
Magistrates of Hsinchu County
Kuomintang politicians in Taiwan